Christine Rayner was a British actress of the silent era.

She was born 21 October 1888  in Holborn, London and died in Exmouth, Devon on 26 September 1973 in Exmouth, Devon at age 84.

Selected filmography

References

External links

1888 births
1973 deaths
English stage actresses
English film actresses
English silent film actresses
20th-century English actresses
Actresses from London